Rajdweep is an Indian screenwriter, playwright, lyricist and journalist hails from Dhing, Nagaon, Assam. He has been awarded by Bollywood superstar Aamir Khan for his script 'Ishqlogy' at Cinestaan India's Storyteller's Script Contest in 2018. He is the first lyricist from Assam who writes Assamese songs in Bollywood film. He wrote the songs 'Jiri Jiri' for the film A Death In The Gunj and the bihu song for the film Jagga Jasoos. Again, he becomes the first screenwriter from Assam who signed a Bollywood film. He signed the film on 21 October 2019.

Personal life and education 

Rajdweep was born on 20 September 1986 in Nagaon, Assam. After doing graduation in Economics from Gauhati University, Rajdweep did Masters in Economics and then completed his master's degree in journalism.

Career

After working in many Assamese films, albums and plays, Rajdweep made his Bollywood debut in the Konkona Sen Sharma directed film A Death in the Gunj (2016) as a lyricist. His song 'Jiri Jiri' was an Assamese song in the film. He has been credited for writing the first full-length Assamese song in any Bollywood film. After that, he again got the opportunity to write a song for Anurag Basu directed film Jagga Jasoos. He wrote the Bihu song 'Lahe Lahe' for this film. Before that, for MTV dewarist show, he penned the widely accepted song called 'Memories' with Papon and Nucleya. His Hindi songs are 'Pakhi Pakhi', 'Aao Kabhi Jo'. As a screenwriter, Rajdweep's first film was Khel-the Game (2015). His other film as screenplay writer Rum Vodka Whisky has been released across Assam. Rajdweep has written songs in many Assamese films and various albums, theatre plays. As the youngest playwright of Assam's unique mobile theatre industry, Rajdweep has written many full-length plays. Apart from these, Rajdweep has a career in professional journalism and he is working as senior sub-editor of a vernacular daily called 'Assamiya Khabar'. He was conferred with the 2018-19 'Best Play of the Year' award for his play, Bondookor Kobita by All Assam Sahitya Sanmilan.

Awards and recognitions

Awarded Assam State Film Award (Dr. Nirmalprabha Bordoloi Memorial Award) for Best Lyricist for the film Dooronir Nirola Poja (2017).
 Fourth award winner at India's Biggest Script Contest by Cinestaan (2018). Awarded by Bollywood Superster Aamir Khan on 26 November, at Novotel Hotel, Juhu, Mumbai. Aamir Khan, Rajkumar Hirani, Anjum Rajabali, Juhi Chaturvedi were the jury members of this mega contest with around 4000 contestants from different parts of India. Rajdweep's script 'Ishqlogy - Something greater than technology' won the fourth prize.
 India Today featured him as 'Young Leader'. The leading news magazine of India featured Rajdweep for his journey from unique Mobile theatre in Assam to Bollywood.
 Best Playwright Award for his play 'Bandookor Kobita' at Oikyotaan Award by  Asom Sahitya Sanmilani Award (2019).
Won the 'Best Popular Playwright of the Year' award by All Assam Cultural Unity Union for the play 'Bahadur' at Nebcus Award 2020. The play was written for Hengool Theatre for the season 2019–2020. The play 'Bahadur' was based on a beautiful triangle love story in the backdrop of a serious issue of human organ trafficking.
Won the 'Best Play' award for the play 'Birikhor Birina' at the historic Nalbari Raas Mahotsav 2022. This play was written for Rajmukut Theatre for the season 2022-23. 'Birikhor Birina' becomes highest grosser play at Nalbari Raas Mahotsav till date.
Won the 'Best Popular Playwright of the Year' at Nebcus National Awards for the play 'Birikhor Birina'. 
Awarded Assam State Film Award (Dr. Nirmalprabha Bordoloi Memorial Award) for Best Lyricist for the song 'Jibon Khupi Khupi' from the film Pratighaat (2019 film).

Works in Assamese language

As screenwriter

Films

Music

As a lyricist

Films

Albums

Assamese albums

Assamese TV series

City Lights
|2021
|Title Track
|Rajdweep
|Zubeen Garg
|NKtv
|}
Aabir
|2022
|Title Track
|Rajdweep
|Simanta Sekhar
|NKtv
|}
Bindas Collony 
|2022
|Title Track
|Rajdweep
| Dr. Sudip Ranjan Medhi
|NKtv
|}

As playwright

Works in Bollywood and Hindi language

As lyricist

Works in Bengali language

As lyricist

Albums

Books & literary works by Rajdweep
Rajdweep had written his book titled 'Guwahati Dot Com' in the year 2010. It was a compilation of his popular column with the same title, which was published in Asomiya Khabar.

Career in journalism
Rajdweep had started his career in the popular newspaper in Assamese language. He worked there as senior sub-editor.

External links

References 

Indian journalists
Indian lyricists
1986 births
Living people